The Journal of Visual Culture is a triannual peer-reviewed academic journal that covers the field of visual arts. The editor-in-chief is Marquard Smith (Royal College of Art). It was established in 2002 and is published by SAGE Publications.

Abstracting and indexing 
The journal is abstracted and indexed in:
 Academic Search Premier
 British Humanities Index
 Social Sciences Citation Index
 Scopus
 Arts and Humanities Citation Index
 Current Contents/Arts and Humanities

External links 
 

SAGE Publishing academic journals
English-language journals
Visual art journals
Publications established in 2002
Triannual journals